Ian Graham Tracey DL  (born 27 May 1955) is an English concert organist who has served as organist titulaire of Liverpool Cathedral since 2008.

Studies and career
Tracey, who was born in Liverpool in 1955, initially studied the organ under the then Organist of Liverpool Cathedral, Noel Rawsthorne.  He subsequently continued his studies at Trinity College, London, before gaining further experience in Paris under André Isoir and Jean Langlais.  In 1980, he succeeded Noel Rawsthorne and, in doing so, became the youngest cathedral organist in the United Kingdom at that time.  He was later appointed Master of the Choristers, in addition to the position of organist, at Liverpool Cathedral.

Since 2008, his position at Liverpool Cathedral has been Organist Titulaire; a role that gives him overall responsibility for the organs and recitals there, whilst affording him time for teaching, recording, writing and lecturing.

In addition to his Cathedral duties, Ian Tracey is also Organist (since 1986) to the City of Liverpool at St. George’s Hall, Chorus Master (since 1985) to the Royal Liverpool Philharmonic Society, Guest Music Director (since 1991) for the BBC's Daily Service, Professor, Fellow and Organist (since 1988) at Liverpool John Moores University and a past President (2001–2003) of the Incorporated Association of Organists. Since 2011, he has been Tonal Director for Makin Organs & Copeman Hart & Company Ltd.

Ian Tracey is in demand as an organ recitalist in the United Kingdom, Europe, and the United States, and has made a number of recordings, both solo and with orchestra.

In July 2006, he was admitted to the degree of Doctor of Music (honoris causa) in the University of Liverpool.  This honorary doctorate was awarded for "his contribution to music". In 2015 he was appointed a Deputy Lieutenant of Merseyside.

Discography

Solo organ
Organ Recital (Various composers) (1989) Classics for Pleasure B000027F5R
1855 "Father" Willis Organ, St Georges Hall, Liverpool RLPO B00006J9MN
Liverpool Encores (1990)Mirabilis Records MRCD901
Ian Tracey plays the Willis Organ of Liverpool Cathedral (Various composers) (2005) Priory Records B0009B0GQS
Bombarde! French Organ Classics (Various composers) Organ of Liverpool Cathedral (1999) Chandos Records B00000IYMZ
Ian Tracey Plays Organ Transcriptions and French Romantic Music on the Henry Willis III Grand Organ of Liverpool Cathedral (Various composers) (2006) Priory B000FO44A8
Ian Tracey - Organ Recital Organ of Liverpool Cathedral (Various composers) (2007) Classics for Pleasure B000MCIB4I

Organ with orchestra
Vaughan Williams: Symphony No 7 (Sinfonia antartica) with Royal Liverpool Philharmonic Orchestra and Choir (2002) Classics for Pleasure B00006J3LP
Poulenc/Guilmant/Widor - Organ Works Organ of Liverpool Cathedral with BBC Philharmonic (2000) Chandos B000000AUI
Guilmant/Widor/Franck - Organ Works Organ of Liverpool Cathedral with BBC Philharmonic (2002) Chandos B00003XB23
Tchaikovsky: 1812 Overture with Royal Liverpool Philharmonic Orchestra (2002) Classics for Pleasure B00006I05D
Fantaisie Triomphale (Various composers) Organ of Liverpool Cathedral with BBC Philharmonic (2007) Chandos

Conductor
Songs of Praise and Worship with Liverpool Cathedral Choir and Merseyside Massed Choirs HMV Classics B00004YL43
Your Favourite Hymns with Liverpool Cathedral Choir and others (1992) Classics B00000DNUE
Spirit of Christmas with the Royal Liverpool Philharmonic Orchestra and Choir, Liverpool Philharmonic Youth Choir and others (2007) RLP

Notes

External links

English classical organists
British male organists
Cathedral organists
Deputy Lieutenants of Merseyside
People associated with Liverpool John Moores University
Living people
1955 births
Musicians from Liverpool
21st-century organists
21st-century British male musicians
Male classical organists